Aerojet Rocketdyne is an American manufacturer of rocket, hypersonic, and electric propulsive systems for space, defense, civil and commercial applications. Headquartered in Sacramento, California, the company is owned by Aerojet Rocketdyne Holdings. Aerojet Rocketdyne was formed in 2013 when Aerojet (then owned by GenCorp) and Pratt & Whitney Rocketdyne were merged, following the latter's acquisition by GenCorp from Pratt & Whitney. On April 27, 2015, the name of the holding company, GenCorp, was changed from GenCorp, Inc. to Aerojet Rocketdyne Holdings, Inc. 

Lockheed Martin announced plans to take over Aerojet Rocketdyne on December 20, 2020 as part of a $4.4 billion acquisition; however this was abandoned by Lockheed on February 13, 2022 after opposition from Raytheon led the FTC to move to block the acquisition.

Products

Current engines
 RS-25 (LH2/LOX) – Previously known as the Space Shuttle main engine (SSME), it was the reusable main engine developed by Rocketdyne for the now-retired Space Shuttle.  Remaining RS-25D engines are planned for use on early Space Launch System rocket launches after which an expendable version, RS-25E will be developed for follow-on SLS launches.
 RL10 (LH2/LOX) – Developed by Pratt & Whitney and currently used on both the upper stage of the Delta IV rocket as well as the Centaur upper stage for the Atlas V. It is also currently used on the Space Launch System on the Interim Cyrogenic Propulsion Stage (ICPS) and will be used on the Exploration Upper Stage (EUS) in the future. Formerly used on the Centaur upper stage for Titan, the Saturn I, and on the vertical-landing McDonnell Douglas DC-X "Delta Clipper". It was intended to serve as the main propulsion engine for the proposed Altair lunar lander.
 RS-68 (LH2/LOX) – First stage engine for the Delta IV, designed as a simplified version of the RS-25 due to its expendable usage. It is the largest hydrogen-fueled rocket engine ever flown.
 MR103G — 0.2 lb Hydrazine monopropellant thruster
 MR111g — 1 lb Hydrazine monopropellant thruster
 MR106L — 5-7 lb Hydrazine monopropellant thruster
 MR107M — 45 lb Hydrazine monopropellant thruster
 Blue Origin CCE (solid rocket motor or SRM) — the Blue Origin New Shepard Crew Capsule Escape Solid Rocket Motor is built by Aerojet Rocketdyne.

Former production engines and others

 Rocketdyne F-1 (RP-1/LOX) The main engine of the Saturn V rocket of the Apollo Space Program. The most powerful single combustion chamber liquid-propellant rocket engine ever developed.
 Rocketdyne J-2 (LH2/LOX) Used on upper stage of Saturn IB and second and upper stages of Saturn V.
 SJ61 (JP-7/ingested air) A dual-mode ramjet/scramjet engine flown on the Boeing X-51 hypersonic demonstration vehicle.
 AJ10 (Aerozine 50/N2O4) Second stage engine for the Delta II, used as the Orbital Maneuvering System (OMS) engine for the Space Shuttle, and the main engine for the European Orion Service Module.
 AR1 (RP-1/LOX) A proposed  thrust RP-1/LOX oxidizer-rich staged combustion cycle engine.
 Rocketdyne H-1 (RP-1/LOX) A first stage engine flown on the Saturn I and Saturn IB launch vehicles.
 RS-27 (RP-1/LOX) A first stage engine flown on the Delta 2000 launch vehicle
 RS-27A (RP-1/LOX) A first stage engine flown on the Delta II and Delta III
J-2X (LH2/LOX) An engine that was originally being developed for the Ares I's upper stage before the cancellation of the Constellation program.  The engine was considered for the Space Launch System's Exploration Upper Stage before being replaced with a cluster of four RL10s. It is based on the Rocketdyne J-2.
 Baby Bantam (kerosene/LOX) An  thrust engine. In June 2014, Aerojet Rocketdyne announced that they had "manufactured and successfully tested an engine which had been entirely 3D printed." 
 AJ-26 (RP-1/LOX) Rebranded and modified NK-33 engines imported from Russia. Used as first stage engine for the Antares before being replaced by the RD-181.
 AJ-60A (Solid - HTPB) A solid rocket motor formerly used for the Atlas V launch vehicle, until being replaced by the Northrop Grumman GEM-63 in 2021 
AR-22 (Hydrogen/LOX) An engine in development from 2017-2020 for the XS-1 spacecraft, also known as the Phantom Express. The engine is based on the RS-25 and utilizing parts remaining in Aerojet Rocketdyne and NASA inventories from earlier versions of the RS-25. Two of the engines would have been built for the spaceplane. Boeing pulled out of the project in January 2020, effectively ending it.

In development

X3 Ion Thruster
On 13 October 2017, it was reported that Aerojet Rocketdyne completed a keystone demonstration on a new X3 ion thruster, which is a central part of the XR-100 system for the NextSTEP program. The X3 ion thruster was designed by the University of Michigan and is being developed in partnership with the University of Michigan, NASA, and the Air Force. The X3 is a Hall-effect thruster  operating at over 100 kW of power. During the demonstration, it broke records for the maximum power output, thrust and operating current achieved by a Hall thruster to date. It operated at a range of power from 5 kW to 102 kW, with electrical current of up to 260 amperes. It generated 5.4 Newtons of thrust, "which is the highest level of thrust achieved by any plasma thruster to date." A novelty in its design is that it incorporates three plasma channels, each a few centimeters deep, nested around one another in concentric rings.

Other notable products

Multi-mission Radioisotope Thermoelectric Generator 
Aerojet Rocketdyne is the prime contractor to the US Department of Energy for the Multi-mission Radioisotope Thermoelectric Generator. The first flight MMRTG is currently powering the Mars Curiosity Rover, and a second flight unit powers the Perseverance Rover.

See also

References

External links

 Aerojet Rocketdyne official site
 Aerojet Rocketdyne Holdings site

Rocketdyne
Aerojet Rocketdyne Holdings
Aerospace companies of the United States
Defense companies of the United States
Manufacturing companies based in California
Technology companies based in Greater Los Angeles
Companies based in Sacramento, California
Canoga Park, Los Angeles
American companies established in 2013
Manufacturing companies established in 2013
Technology companies established in 2013
2013 establishments in California